Albert Hughes and Allen Hughes (born April 1, 1972), known together professionally as the Hughes brothers, are American film directors and producers. The pair, who are twins, are known for co-directing visceral, and often violent, movies, including 1993's  Menace II Society, 1995's Dead Presidents, 2001's From Hell and 2010's The Book of Eli. The brothers did most of their collaboration between 1993 and 2001. Since 2004, when Albert moved to Prague, Czech Republic, he and Allen have only directed one film together, The Book of Eli in 2010. They have been involved in directing and producing film and television projects separately since 2005.

Early lives
The Hughes brothers were born in Detroit, Michigan to an African American father, Albert Hughes, and an Armenian American mother, Aida, whose family were Iranian Armenians from Tehran. Albert is the older of the twins by nine minutes; although they originally believed themselves to be fraternal twins, they suspect they may be identical despite not having had a DNA test. Their parents divorced when they were two years old. The twins moved with their mother to Claremont, California, east of Los Angeles, when they were nine. Their mother raised Albert and Allen alone while putting herself through school and starting her own business, a vocational center. Supportive of her sons' ambitions as filmmakers, she gave them a video camera when they were 12. The boys spent their free time making short films. When a teacher suggested that they make a "How To" film for an assignment, they complied with a short film, "How to Be a Burglar."

Career
After Allen had a son at the age of 18, the twins dropped out of high school and soon began working on music videos as teenagers, directing for artists like Tone Loc and Tupac Shakur. Their first feature film, 1993's Menace II Society premiered at the Cannes Film Festival. Centering on black, disenfranchised youth, it was made on a budget of $3.5 million when they were 20 years old. Tyger Williams wrote the screenplay, and shared story credit with the brothers. It became a critical as well as a box office success and was nominated for an Independent Spirit Award for Best First Feature. Because of their previous experience in directing music videos, they became the first sibling duo since Jerry and David Zucker allowed a waiver by the Directors Guild of America to take co-credit as directors.

Their second film was Dead Presidents in 1995. Dealing with the black underclass society like their feature film debut, and also starring Larenz Tate, the film centered on war veterans during the racially charged Vietnam War era. The film, which was released at the New York Critics Film Festival, failed to make as much of a profit as their first film. They followed Dead Presidents with American Pimp, a feature-length documentary about the underground pimp culture and exploitation of women. It premiered at the 1999 Sundance Film Festival. They had originally set out to do an adaptation of Iceberg Slim's novel Pimp, but someone else acquired the rights. The brothers have stated that the film's perspective was partially shaped by being raised by their mother, who is a feminist. In between projects, they filmed several anti-handgun public service announcements.

In a departure from their previous material, the Hughes brothers co-directed From Hell, the 2001 film adaptation of Alan Moore's graphic novel of the same name about the Jack the Ripper murders in Victorian England, starring Johnny Depp and Heather Graham. Considered too violent and gory by some critics, the film had to be edited in order to avoid an NC-17 rating by the MPAA. As described by the film's star, there were sometimes disagreements between the twins regarding the direction of the film. For example, the amount of shown violence was a point of contention between the two; one brother thought the brutality should be shown, while the other believed implied violence would suffice.

Their only film together since 2001's From Hell was the post-apocalyptic drama Book of Eli for Warner Bros., which was released in January 2010.

In 2006, the brothers were announced as directing The Iceman, a film about serial killer Richard Kuklinski, but it was eventually directed by Ariel Vromen, and released in 2012. They were also slated to direct a film version of the classic TV series Kung Fu. It was announced in 2010 that the brothers were tapped to direct a live-action adaptation of the 1988 manga Akira, but they left the project in 2011.

As a team, Allen typically works with the actors while Albert handles the technical aspects of their films, stemming from Albert's experience of taking classes at Los Angeles City College's film school.

Solo projects

Allen Hughes
Allen directed a few episodes of the American version of the TV series Touching Evil (for which his brother was an executive producer) as well as the 2005 television feature Knights of the South Bronx.

In 2009, Allen directed a segment of New York, I Love You, starring Drea De Matteo and Bradley Cooper.

Allen Hughes directed the 2013 film Broken City, a crime thriller starring Mark Wahlberg and Russell Crowe. He directed the four-part 2017 HBO documentary miniseries The Defiant Ones, about music producers Jimmy Iovine and Dr. Dre.

Albert Hughes
In 2005, it was announced that Albert would direct a feature film called Art Con, although no further news was reported on its development.

In December 2012, Albert Hughes announced that he would be producing an online video series using the Crysis 3 game engine called The 7 Wonders of Crysis 3.

In 2018, Albert Hughes directed his first solo feature film, Alpha. The film was written by Daniele Sebastian Wiedenhaupt, based on a story written by Hughes, and holds an approval rating of 79% and is “certified fresh” on review aggregator website Rotten Tomatoes.

Personal lives
Known as much for their frank manner as for their films, the Hughes Brothers have been known to get into altercations. They took the rap artist Tupac Shakur to court in 1994, after he assaulted them during a music video shoot. Shakur had originally been slated to star in Menace II Society, but was replaced after the incident that apparently stemmed from Shakur's disliking the role they had chosen for him. He was later sentenced to 15 days in jail for the assault as well as another incident that occurred a day before his sentencing.

The brothers have also made no secret of their use of marijuana and have previously turned down an offer to do anti-marijuana commercials.

Allen has a son with singer/songwriter Stephanie "Stevvi" Alexander, Eric Alexander-Hughes.
Albert has a daughter, Adrienne Hughes, and has been living in the Czech Republic since 2004.

In a 2013 interview, Albert stated that the brothers "love each other," but are also "kind of in a weird dance right now."

Filmography

Solo works
Allen Hughes

Albert Hughes

References

External links

Armenian Dramatic Arts Alliance: Allen Hughes
Armenian Dramatic Arts Alliance: Albert Hughes

1972 births
African-American film directors
American people of Armenian descent
Film producers from Michigan
American music video directors
Los Angeles City College alumni
Sibling filmmakers
American twins
Writers from Detroit
Film directors from Michigan
American writers of Iranian descent
Living people
American expatriates in the Czech Republic
21st-century African-American people
20th-century African-American people